Thelazioidea is a superfamily of spirurian nematodes in the large order Spirurida. Like all nematodes, they have neither a circulatory nor a respiratory system.

Among the families placed here, only the Rhabdochonidae are notably diverse. though none is considered to be monotypic Consequently, the Thelazioidea are among the mid-sized superfamilies of Spirurida.

The families of the Thelazioidea are:
 Pneumospiruridae
 Rhabdochonidae
 Thelaziidae

References 

Spirurida
Animal superfamilies